Gilbert Edwin Cartwright (18 April 1916 – 10 May 2002) was an  Australian rules footballer who played with Hawthorn in the Victorian Football League (VFL).

Notes

External links 

1916 births
2002 deaths
Australian rules footballers from Melbourne
Hawthorn Football Club players
Sandringham Football Club players
Australian Army personnel of World War II
Australian Army soldiers
People from Sandringham, Victoria
Military personnel from Melbourne